La Pointe de Thivelet (or Pointe de Thimelet) is mountain culminating at 1231 m above sea level and located in the township of Corbel in Savoie. It is situated in the Chartreuse Mountains.

Mountains of the Alps
Mountains of Savoie